The Drache-class ironclads were a pair of wooden-hulled armored frigates built for the Austro-Hungarian Navy in the 1860s, the first ironclads built for Austria-Hungary. They participated in the Austrian victory over the Italians in the Battle of Lissa, where Drache destroyed the coastal defense ship , one of two Italian ships sunk in the action. Both ships were withdrawn from front-line service in 1875. Draches hull was in poor condition, so she was discarded and eventually broken up in 1883, and Salamander became a harbor guard ship. She was hulked in 1883 and converted into floating storage for naval mines before being scrapped in 1895–1896.

Design
The launch of the French , the world's first ironclad warship, started a naval arms race between the major European powers. The Austrian Navy began a major ironclad construction program under the direction of Archduke Ferdinand Max, the Marinekommandant (naval commander) and brother of Kaiser Franz Josef I, the emperor of Austria. The ships were rated as third-class armored frigates.

Characteristics

Their hulls were of wooden construction with iron armor plates riveted over top. The ships had a complement of 346 officers and crewmen.

The ships had a horizontal 2-cylinder steam engine that drove their single propeller using steam provided by four coal-fired boilers that exhausted through one funnel. For long-distance travel, the Draches were fitted with three masts and barque rigged. Between 1869 and 1872, both ships had their rigging increased with a larger sail area.

The frigates were broadside ironclads, and were armed with ten 48-pounder smoothbore guns and eighteen 24-pounder rifled, muzzle-loading (RML) guns. These guns were mounted in gun ports along the length of the hull. In 1867, these guns were removed, and ten Armstrong RML  guns and two bronze RML  guns were installed in their place. They were equipped with ram bows.

Ships

Service

Two years after the ships entered service, Austria joined Prussia in the Second Schleswig War against Denmark. Drache and Salamander were kept in the Adriatic to defend against a possible Danish attack, which failed to materialize. In 1866, Austria's erstwhile ally Prussia signed an alliance with Italy directed against Austria, beginning the Seven Weeks' War. The Austrian fleet was commanded by Rear Admiral Wilhelm von Tegetthoff, who attacked the Italian fleet as it attempted to capture the island of Lissa in the central Adriatic. In the ensuring Battle of Lissa, both ships were heavily engaged, with Drache inflicting fatal damage to the coastal defense ship , setting her on fire and ultimately destroying her. Drache did not escape unscathed, however, as she was hit by Italian shells numerous times; she lost her main mast, was temporarily set on fire, and her commander was killed. Salamander engaged the leading ships of the Italian line, though neither side inflicted serious damage on the other. Nevertheless, the loss of Palestro and the ironclad  led the demoralized Italian fleet to disengage and retreat to their base at Ancona.

Both ships were modernized twice after the war, receiving new guns in 1867, and again at the end of the decade when their rigging was increased. They saw little use thereafter, however. Badly rotted by 1875, Drache was stricken from the naval register on 13 June that year and eventually broken up for scrap in 1883. Salamander lingered on in service as a guard ship from 1875 until 18 March 1883, when she too was stricken from the register and converted into a mine storage hulk. She served in this capacity until 1895 when she was sold for scrap and dismantled over the following year.

Footnotes

References